Mustafizur Rahman (20 January 1941 – 3 August 2008) was a Bangladeshi Army general who served as the Chief of Army Staff of the Bangladesh Army from December 1997 until 23 December 2000.

Early life
Rahman was born in Rangpur, East Pakistan. He was a cousin-in-law of Sheikh Mujibur Rahman since he married Mujib's cousin, and was an uncle of Sheikh Hasina.

Career
General Mustafiz graduated BSc in Civil Engineering from Ahsanullah University (Presently, Bangladesh University of Engineering Technology) in the year of 1965. On 19 May 1966 he was commissioned in the Corps of Engineers as Second Lieutenant from Pakistan Military Academy, Kakul. The then Captain Mustafiz fought valiantly in Bangladesh Liberation War, 1971 as sub sector Commander in Jessore sector. During Liberation War he was wounded in November 1971 and received gallantry award “Bir Bikrom” by the Government of People’s Republic of Bangladesh. He was promoted to the rank of Major during the liberation war. After the liberation war the General served in many capacities of Bangladesh Army. During his tenure as Major he served in 55 Infantry Division, Jessore as Brigade Major and then as Garrison Engineer (GE) in Dhaka Cantonment. In 1973 he was promoted to the rank of Lieutenant Colonel. In this rank he served as Commander Military Engineering Services (CMES) appointment both in Dhaka and Bogura Cantonment, as Chief Instructor in Engineer Centre and School of Military Engineering (EC&SME), Dayarampur and as Commanding Officer (CO) he commanded 8 Engineer Battalion in Syedpur from 1975-1979. He successfully completed his Defence Services Command and Staff College in 1979. Afterwards, as a Colonel he was a Director of Army Headquarters (AHQ), General Staff Branch (GS Br). In the rank of Brigadier he was appointed as Military Attaché, Turkey in Deputation (1982-1984), then he was Managing Director (MD) of Mukti Joddha Kollan Trust in 1985, after that he was again posted to AHQ as Director Engineer in 1986, Commanded 101 Infantry Brigade, Cumilla as Brigade Commander from 1986-1989, he also served as Director Operation and Plan Directorate, Supreme Command Headquarters (Presently, Armed Forces Division) from 1989-1990. He completed his National Defence Course from India in the year of 1991. In 1992 he was promoted to the rank of Major General and posted to AHQ as Master General of Ordnance (MGO). In this rank he was appointed as General Officer Commanding (GOC) of 55 Infantry Division, Jessore from 1992-1995, then he served Engineer in Chief (E in C), AHQ in 1996 and afterwards he was posted as Director General (DG) of National Security Intelligence (NSI) in 1997. He served as Chief of Army Staff of Bangladesh Army from December 1997- December 2000. He was the first General of Bangladesh Army

Controversy
Rahman was one of the accused in a corruption case regarding the procurement of MiG-29 for Bangladesh Air Force along with other government officials including Bangladesh Prime Minister Sheikh Hasina.

References

1941 births
2008 deaths
Chiefs of Army Staff, Bangladesh
Pakistan Military Academy alumni
Bangladesh Army generals
Recipients of the Bir Bikrom
Mukti Bahini personnel
National Defence College, India alumni